William Murdoch Buchanan (November 30, 1897 - September 5, 1966) was a Canadian politician and dentist. Born in North Sydney, Nova Scotia, Buchanan was elected to the House of Commons of Canada in the 1953 election as a Member of the Liberal Party to represent the riding of Cape Breton North and Victoria. He was defeated in the elections of 1957 and 1958.

External links

1897 births
1966 deaths
Liberal Party of Canada MPs
Members of the House of Commons of Canada from Nova Scotia
People from North Sydney, Nova Scotia